Sambo Creek is a traditional Garífuna village  east of La Ceiba on the Caribbean Sea north coast of Honduras.

Culture
Sambo Creek has one of the largest Garifuna population in Honduras and is considered to be one of the epicenters of cultural preservation. An annual fair in June is held there and traditional dances are still practiced, like the punta.

Demographics
The ethnic composition is 65% Garifuna, 35% Mestizo.

Notable people
Rolando Palacios, Honduran Olympic Sprinter.
Milton Núñez, Honduran footballer.

References

Garifuna communities
Populated places in Honduras